The Brandeckkopf is , and the highest mountain in the borough of Offenburg.

At 686.1 metres above sea level, the Brandeckkopf is the highest mountain of Offenburg. It is located within the Zell-Weierbach district. The Brandeckturm, an observation tower, stands at the summit. The mountain is said to have been given its name by the Celts, who brought burnt offerings here. The mountain lies within the 1897 hectare Brandeck  landscape protection area.

References

Mountains and hills of Baden-Württemberg
Mountains and hills of the Black Forest
Mountains under 1000 metres